Artime is a Spanish surname. Notable people with the surname include:

Ángel Fernández Artime (born 1960), Spanish Roman Catholic priest
Manuel Artime (1932–1977), Cuban anti-Fidel Castro Guerilla 
Luis Artime (born 1938), Argentine footballer
Luis Fabián Artime (born 1965), Argentine footballer

Spanish-language surnames